The Productive People's Party was a short-lived leftist political party formed during the Fujian Rebellion in November 1933. It was formed by officers of the National Revolutionary Army's 19th Route Army. They were disaffected by Chiang Kai-shek's domination of both the Kuomintang and the Republic of China. The party's general secretary was Chen Mingshu.

The platform consisted of anti-imperialism, especially against Japan, democracy, overthrow of Chiang and the right-wing of the Nationalist Party, rule of the workers and peasants, land reform, and so on.

When the rebellion collapsed in January 1934, the party fled to Hong Kong where it self-dissolved.
It was succeeded by the Chinese Peasants' and Workers' Democratic Party.

Notes

References 

Defunct political parties in China
Political parties disestablished in 1934
Political parties established in 1933
Political parties in the Republic of China
Socialist parties in China
Formerly ruling communist parties